West Halifax is an unincorporated village in the town of Halifax, Windham County, Vermont, United States. West Halifax has a post office with ZIP code 05358.

References

Unincorporated communities in Windham County, Vermont
Unincorporated communities in Vermont